Umar Abrahams (born 7 February 1981) is a South African cricketer. He played 36 first-class and 43 List A matches between 1998 and 2010. He was also part of South Africa's squad for the 2000 Under-19 Cricket World Cup.

References

External links
 

1981 births
Living people
South African cricketers
Eastern Province cricketers
Gauteng cricketers
Cricketers from Port Elizabeth